Monteplase is an antithrombic proposed for use in acute myocardial infarction.

References

Antithrombotic agents